The Tonga national netball team represents Tonga in international women's netball. Although netball has been played in Tonga, they joined the International Netball Federation in 2011. Tonga won bronze at the South Pacific Games in 1983, 1991 and 1995. On 21 July 2019, Tonga Re-entered at nineteenth in the INF World Rankings.

In June 2022 the team was renamed the Tonga Tala.

They were undefeated at the 2023 Oceania Netball World Cup Qualifiers, and qualified for the 2023 Netball World Cup. Following the qualifiers they were ranked 9th in the world. In March 2023 they rose to 7th ranked following the PacificAus Series.

Current squad
Tongan netball team for the 2023 Oceania Netball World Cup Qualifiers:

Competitive history

See also
Netball in Tonga

References

National netball teams of Oceania
N
Netball in Tonga